Gagea hiensis  is a species of flowering plant in the lily family. It is native to Korea, Mongolia, China (Gansu, Hebei, Heilongjiang, Jilin, Liaoning, Qinghai, Shaanxi, Shanxi), and Far Eastern Russia (Amur Oblast, Khabarovsk, Primorye, Kuril Islands, Zabaykalsky Krai).

Gagea hiensis  is a bulb-forming perennial up to 20 cm tall. Flowers are yellow to yellow-green.

References

hiensis
Flora of Mongolia
Flora of Chita Oblast
Flora of Amur Oblast
Flora of Khabarovsk Krai
Flora of Primorsky Krai
Flora of the Kuril Islands
Flora of Qinghai
Flora of North-Central China
Flora of Manchuria
Flora of Korea
Plants described in 1904